George James Felos (born March 1952) is an American lawyer specializing in right-to-die cases.  He is best known for representing Terri Schiavo's husband Michael.

Early life and education
Raised Greek-Orthodox, Felos graduated from Boston University School of Law with a Juris Doctor in 1976. He was admitted to the Florida Bar in 1977.

Career
In 1990 he represented the family of Estelle Browning in an earlier right-to-die case at the Florida Supreme Court. Browning while still healthy had written a living will asking not to be artificially kept alive, before suffering a serious stroke which had left her in a nursing home reliant on a feeding tube for nearly 3 years; a judge had prevented the will being enacted, but Felos litigated the case even after Browning's death in 1989. In 1990 in a "landmark ruling" the Florida Supreme Court decided in Browning's favor, ruling that the permanently incapacitated need not be force-fed.

His conduct in the Schiavo case caused controversy, because he had Terry Schiavo moved to the Woodside Hospice, Florida, where until recently he had been chairman of the board.

He is also the author of Litigation as Spiritual Practice (Blue Dolphin Publishing), which combined discussion of legal practice with spiritual reflections on meditation and new-age religious beliefs.

References

External links
 Publisher's page for Litigation as Spiritual Practice

Florida lawyers
Terri Schiavo case
Living people
1952 births